Rogue's Yarn is a 1957 British crime drama film directed by Vernon Sewell and starring Nicole Maurey, Derek Bond and Elwyn Brook-Jones. It was shot as a second feature at Brighton Studios. The film's sets were designed by the art director Bernard Sarron. It was distributed by the independent Eros Films.

Synopsis
John Marsden is conducting a passionate affair with Frenchwoman Michele Cartier, but their hopes that his wealthy invalid wife will soon die are thwarted by her recovery. Pressured by his love Marsden begins planning a perfect crime to murder his wife at the family home while he is supposed to be sailing on his yacht between Newhaven and Le Havre in Normandy. However, his hopes of getting clean away from the crime are threatened by the persistent investigations of Detective Inspector Walker.

Cast
 Nicole Maurey as Michele Cartier
 Derek Bond as John Marsden
 Elwyn Brook-Jones as Inspector Walker
 Hugh Latimer as 	Sergeant Adams
 John Serret as Inspector Lafarge
 John Salew as 	Sam Youles
 Nigel Fitzgerald as 	Commissioner
 Joan Carol as 	Nurse
 Madoline Thomas as Cook
 Agatha Carroll as Hester Marsden
 Barbara Christie as 	Maid
 Hugh Morton as Doctor
 Colin Tapley as Police Inspector
 Sidney Vivian as 	Corner Shop Proprietor
 André Maranne as French Fisherman

References

Bibliography
 Chibnall, Steve & McFarlane, Brian. The British 'B' Film. Palgrave MacMillan, 2009.

External links
 

1957 films
1950s mystery films
1957 crime films
British mystery films
British crime films
Films directed by Vernon Sewell
Eros Films films
Films set in London
Films shot in East Sussex
Films set in East Sussex
Films set in Normandy
1950s English-language films
1950s British films